The Wanderers (Italian:I girovaghi) is a 1956 Italian drama film directed by Hugo Fregonese and starring Peter Ustinov, Carla Del Poggio and Abbe Lane. The film's sets were designed by the art director Luigi Scaccianoce.

Cast
  Peter Ustinov as Don Alfonso Pugliesi  
 Carla Del Poggio as Lia 
 Abbe Lane as Dolores  
 Gaetano Autiero as Il piccolo Calogero detto Cardello 
 Giuseppe Porelli as Prof. Kroll  
 Rocco D'Assunta as Un corteggiatore di Dolores  
 Angelo Dessy as Un mafioso 
 Luciano Vincenzoni

References

Bibliography 
 Moliterno, Gino. The A to Z of Italian Cinema. Scarecrow Press, 2009.

External links 
 

Films directed by Hugo Fregonese
1956 films
1956 drama films
Italian drama films
1950s Italian-language films
Films with screenplays by Luciano Vincenzoni
Films scored by Angelo Francesco Lavagnino
1950s Italian films